The 15th Annually South African Traditional Music Awards took place on November 27, 2021. The awards celebrated achievements in music and entertainment.

The nominees were announced on September 25, 2021.

Performers

Winners and nominees 
Below list are nominees and winners.  Winners  are listed first in boldface.

References 

 2021 awards
 2021 music awards